Ballantinia is a genus of plants in the family Brassicaceae.

Species:
Ballantinia antipoda - Southern shepherd's purse

References

Brassicaceae
Brassicaceae genera